Ephysteris insulella is a moth in the family Gelechiidae. It was described by Hermann von Heinemann in 1870. It is found in France, Germany, Switzerland, Italy, Bulgaria, Romania and Russia. Outside of Europe, it is found in south-eastern Kazakhstan, southern Siberia, Mongolia and China (Inner Mongolia, Xinjiang).

The length of the forewings is 7–8 mm. The forewings are covered with cream, yellow-tipped scales and mottled by rare dark-grey scales at the termen and along the veins. There is a small dark point at one-third and a dark spot at two-thirds near the posterior margin. The hindwings are pale grey. Adults are on wing from July to August.

Subspecies
Ephysteris insulella insulella
Ephysteris insulella praticolella (Christoph, 1872) (Italy, Balkans, south-western Russia, Tuva)

References

Ephysteris
Moths described in 1870